The 1950 USA Outdoor Track and Field Championships men's competition took place between June 23–25 at Byrd Stadium on the campus of the University of Maryland in College Park, Maryland. The women's division held their championships separately at the newly opened Hopper Field in Freeport, Texas. The decathlon was held a week later in Tulare, California, where Olympic champion Bob Mathias set his first world record on his home track.

The Marathon championships were run in October at the Yonkers Marathon.

Results

Men track events

Men field events

Women track events

Women field events

See also
United States Olympic Trials (track and field)

References

 results from Track & Field News
 women's results
 men's results

USA Outdoor Track and Field Championships
Usa Outdoor Track And Field Championships, 1950
Track and field
Track and field in Maryland
1950 in sports in Maryland
Sports in Maryland
Track and field in Texas
1950 in sports in Texas
Sports competitions in Texas